Lucio Francis Russo (May 14, 1912 – April 20, 2004) was an American lawyer and  politician from New York.

Life
He was born on May 14, 1912, in New Castle, Pennsylvania. He graduated from Fordham Law School, and practiced law in Staten Island. He entered politics as a Republican.

He was a member of the New York State Assembly from 1953 to 1974, sitting in the 169th, 170th, 171st, 172nd, 173rd, 174th, 175th, 176th, 177th, 178th, 178th and 179th New York State Legislatures. In 1974, he ran for re-nomination in the Republican primary, but was defeated by Guy Molinari.

On April 20, 2004, Russo and his wife Tina were killed in a car crash in Boynton Beach, Florida, where they were living for the winter.

References

1912 births
2004 deaths
Road incident deaths in Florida
American people of Italian descent
Fordham University School of Law alumni
Republican Party members of the New York State Assembly
People from Boynton Beach, Florida
People from New Castle, Pennsylvania
20th-century American politicians
Politicians from Staten Island